Wamiqa Gabbi (born 29 September 1993) is an Indian actress, who works in Punjabi, Hindi, Malayalam, Tamil and Telugu films. She made her screen debut in the Hindi film Jab We Met (2007) with a small role. But her major success came with Tu Mera 22 Main Tera 22 (2013) alongside Yo Yo Honey Singh and Amrinder Gill. Then she went onto star in many Punjabi films like Ishq Brandy (2014), Nikka Zaildar 2 (2017), Parahuna (2018), Dil Diyan Gallan (2019) and Nikka Zaildar 3 (2019).

Personal life
Gabbi was born in a Punjabi family in Chandigarh on 29 September 1993. Her father Govardhan Gabbi is an author and writes in Hindi and Punjabi language, who uses Gabbi as a pseudonym.

Career
She is a trained Kathak dancer. Her big break came with the Punjabi film with Yo Yo Honey Singh and Amrinder Gill, Tu Mera 22 Mai Tera 22. She went on to star in two other Punjabi films Ishq Brandy and Ishq Haazir Hai as a co-star to actor Diljit Dosanjh.

She gave her first female lead role as Tanisha in Sixteen. She starred as the lead actress in the Telugu film Bhale Manchi Roju as the female lead.

Gabbi starred as the female lead in a Tamil film Maalai Nerathu Mayakkam (2016). She was the female lead in the Malayalam film Godha alongside Tovino Thomas. In March 2017, Wamiqa signed onto a new Tamil film, Iravaakaalam, directed by Ashwin Saravanan, also starring Sshivada and S. J. Surya. Wamiqa played the lead role in 9, also starring Prithviraj Sukumaran and Mamta Mohandas. Wamiqa starred as the female lead opposite Ishaan Khattar in a short film Fursat by Vishal Bhardwaj released in 2023.

Filmography

Web series

Music videos

References

External links

 
 
 

1993 births
Living people
Actresses from Chandigarh
Indian film actresses
Indian television actresses
Actresses in Punjabi cinema
Actresses in Hindi cinema
Actresses in Malayalam cinema
Actresses in Tamil cinema
Actresses in Telugu cinema
Actresses in Hindi television
21st-century Indian actresses